Carlos Alejandro Campo (born September 5, 1958) is the thirtieth president of Ashland University in Ashland, Ohio.

Campo had previously been president of Regent University from August 2010 to October 2013. He had also done educational consulting for the Bill & Melinda Gates Foundation.

Campo holds a PhD in English, Master of Arts in English, and Bachelor of Arts in Theater, all from the University of Nevada, Las Vegas.

Presidential tenure 
Campo worked with the US Department of Education to expand the University's correctional education program, and AU became one of 69 schools to be chosen to participate in the Pell Experimental Site Initiative (Pell ESI). Since that time, the program has been recognized for providing access to thousands of incarcerated individuals, and is now among the nation's largest.

In April 2020, Campo announced pay cuts to hundreds of Ashland University faculty, including cutting his own salary by 18%. Campo identified the COVID-19 pandemic as to what prompted the pay cuts. In the spring of 2021, Campo accounted that those who had salaries cut would be restored and would receive back-pay for the amount salaries had been cut.

The faculty senate of Ashland University held a private meeting in which they held a vote of "no confidence" in current president Campo. The vote passed 34–1. The vote was called after President Campo set a motion to "sunset" or cut the university's program offerings from over 70 down to 25.

In October 2020, the Ashland University Board of Trustees unanimously voted to extend President Campo's contract through May 31, 2024.

Dr. Campo has led the University's most successful comprehensive fundraising campaign in its history, and it is now on track to double its goal and reach $100 million.

Achievements and associations

In 2016, Campo was awarded the University of Nevada Las Vegas Alumni Association's Alumnus of the Year award.

Campo is currently on the advisory board of the Social Capital Campaign and the Museum of the Bible.

Previously, he has served on the board of E3: Elevate Early Education and continues as the Chair of the Alliance for Hispanic Education.

Campo was elected as a member of the NCAA's President's Council, and serves on their finance committee.

Campo is also a member of the 50 Club of Cleveland, and was appointed as an Ohio Commodore. He is also a member of the executive committee of the Ohio Foundation of Independent Colleges (OFIC)

References

2. https://biologos.org/about-us/advisory-council/carlos-campo

External links
 Carlos Campo on LinkedIn

Heads of universities and colleges in the United States
Living people
University of Nevada, Las Vegas alumni
1958 births